Al Jazeera Urdu (Arabic: الجزيرة أردو, Urdu: الجزیرہ اردو) was a 24-hour news channel announced by Al Jazeera in 2006. It would have been an Urdu language version catering to Pakistan, offered as part of ARY Digital.

See also 
 List of Indian television stations

Notes and references 

Al Jazeera